R 19/12 is a decision issued on April 25, 2014 by the Enlarged Board of Appeal of the European Patent Office (EPO), in which the Enlarged Board allowed an objection of suspicion of partiality against its Chairman, the Vice-President of Directorate General 3 (DG3) (the Boards of Appeal Directorate), and ordered that he be replaced, because he was also acting as member of the Management Committee of the EPO. In 2014, the effects of the decision were said to be potentially far-reaching.

Following the decision, an organisational and structural reform of the EPO has been undertaken aiming at a clearer separation of the Boards of Appeal, i.e. the judiciary of the EPO, from its executive branch.

See also 
 Art. 23 1/15, Art. 23 2/15 and Art. 23 1/16, decisions relating to the suspension of a member of the EPO Boards of Appeal
 Wim van der Eijk, former Vice-President of the EPO, and head of the DG3 (Appeals), who was recused in R 19/12
 G 2/19, referral to the Enlarged Board of Appeal notably dealing with the proper location of the Boards of Appeal

References

Further reading
 : "Suspected partiality of the Chairman of the Enlarged Board of Appeal"

External links
 R 0019/12 (Ablehnung wegen Besorgnis der Befangenheit) of 25.4.2014

R 2012 19